Davide Daniele Silvestri (born 14 March 1980 in Sarzana) is a former Italian cyclist.

Major results
2003
 1st Stage 2 Giro del Veneto
 1st Stage 4 Girobio
2005
 1st Overall Tour du Cameroun
1st Stage 1

References

1980 births
Living people
Italian male cyclists
People from Sarzana
Sportspeople from the Province of La Spezia
Cyclists from Liguria